Marian Stanchev (born 6 April 1988) is a Bulgarian football player, currently playing as a left defender.

References

Living people
1988 births
Bulgarian footballers
OFC Vihren Sandanski players
PFC Svetkavitsa players
First Professional Football League (Bulgaria) players

Association football defenders